David McNally is an activist and the NEH Cullen Distinguished Professor of History and Business at the University of Houston. He was previously (1983-2018) a professor of Political Science at York University in Toronto, Ontario, and was chair of the university's Department of Political Science for several years. He is the author of many books and scholarly articles and the winner of the 2012 Deutscher Memorial Award and the 2012 Paul Sweezy Award.

He has a long history of involvement with and support for social justice movements and organizations.

Awards 
 2012 Deutscher Memorial Award for Monsters of the Market: Zombies, Vampires and Global Capitalism
 2012 Paul Sweezy Award from American Sociological Association for Global Slump: The Economics and Politics of Crisis and Resistance

Books 
McNally has published many books, including:
 Political Economy and the Rise of Capitalism, Berkeley: University of California Press, 1988 
 Against the Market: Political Economy, Market Socialism and the Marxist Critique, London: Verso, 1993
 Bodies of Meaning: Studies on Language, Labor, and Liberation, Albany: State University of New York Press, 2000 
 Another World is Possible: Globalization and Anti-Capitalism, Winnipeg: Arbeiter Ring Publishing, first edition 2001, second edition 2006. 2005 
 Monsters of the Market: Zombies, Vampires and Global Capitalism, Boston: Brill, 2011/ Chicago: Haymarket, 2013. Winner of the 2012 Deutscher Memorial Award.
 Global Slump: The Economics and Politics of Crisis and Resistance, Oakland, CA: PM Press, 2010. Winner of the 2012 Paul Sweezy Award.
 Blood and Money: War, Slavery, Finance and Empire, Chicago: Haymarket Books, 2020.

He has contributed over 60 articles to journals such as Historical Materialism, Capital and Class, History of Political Thought, New Politics and Studies in Political Economy.

References

External links 

 Personal website

1953 births
Living people
Canadian political scientists
Marxist theorists
Deutscher Memorial Prize winners
University of Houston faculty
Academic staff of York University
York University alumni
Evergreen State College alumni
Canadian Marxists
Writers about globalization
Anti-globalization activists